Mera Dil Tere Liye is a 1992 Indian Hindi-language film, directed by S. A. Chandrasekhar and produced by Mrs. Shohreh Bhagat. The film stars Gopi Bhalla, Dinesh, Aruna Irani and Shily Kapoor. The film was a remake of director's own Tamil film Nanbargal.

Cast 

Gopi Bhalla  as  Gopi Bhalla
Dinesh  as  Peter Pereira
Aruna Irani  as  Phoolwa
Shily Kapoor  as  Bheema
Kader Khan  as  Principal Sinha
Mamta Kulkarni  as  Priya R. Singh
Daman Maan  as  Vikram A. Singh
Anjana Mumtaz  as  Savitri R. Singh
Raza Murad  as  Raghunath Singh
Gopaldas Neeraj  as  Vijay Verma
Tiku Talsania  as  Phoolwa's husband
Arun Verma  as  Salim

Soundtrack 
The music was composed by Babul Bose.

References

External links 
 

1992 films
1990s Hindi-language films
Hindi remakes of Tamil films
Films scored by Babul Bose
Films directed by S. A. Chandrasekhar